Polichne was a town of ancient Chios, mentioned by Herodotus.

Its site is unlocated.

References

Populated places in the ancient Aegean islands
Former populated places in Greece
Ancient Chios